Gordon Park may refer to:

Places
Gordon Park, Cleveland, a city park located on the lakefront
Gordon Park, Milwaukee, a county park in Milwaukee, Wisconsin, USA
Gordon Park, Queensland, a suburb of Brisbane, Australia
Gordon Park, Zimbabwe

People
Lady in the Lake trial, a 1976 murder and 2005 trial in which Gordon Park (1944–2010) was convicted of murder and jailed for life
Gordon L. Park (1937–2010), petroleum engineer, geologist and politician in Wyoming

See also
Gordon Parks (1912–2006), American photographer